Cuba and the United States restored diplomatic relations on July 20, 2015. Relations had been severed in 1961 during the Cold War. U.S. diplomatic representation in Cuba is handled by the United States Embassy in Havana, and there is a similar Cuban Embassy in Washington, D.C. The United States, however, continues to maintain its commercial, economic, and financial embargo, making it illegal for U.S. corporations to do business with Cuba.

Relations began in early colonial times and were focused around extensive trade. In the 19th century, manifest destiny increasingly led to American desire to buy, conquer, or otherwise take some control of Cuba. This included an attempt to buy it from Spain in 1848 during the Polk administration, and a secret attempt to buy it in 1854 during the Pierce administration known as the Ostend Manifesto, which backfired, caused a scandal and severely weakened Pierce's presidency. The hold of the Spanish Empire on possessions in the Americas had already been reduced in the 1820s as a result of the Spanish American wars of independence; only Cuba and Puerto Rico remained under Spanish rule until the Spanish–American War (1898) that resulted from the Cuban War of Independence. Under the Treaty of Paris, Cuba became a U.S. protectorate from 1898 to 1902; the U.S. gained a position of economic and political dominance over the island, which persisted after it became formally independent in 1902.

Following the Cuban Revolution of 1959, bilateral relations deteriorated substantially. On August 6, 1960, the Cuban government, under President Osvaldo Dorticós Torrado and Prime Minister Fidel Castro, nationalized all American owned oil refineries located within Cuba's national borders. Along with sugar factories and mines, Cuba seized approximately $1.7 billion in U.S. oil assets. In October 1960, the U.S. imposed and subsequently tightened a comprehensive set of restrictions and bans against the Cuban government, ostensibly in retaliation for the nationalization of U.S. corporations' property by Cuba. In 1961 the U.S. severed diplomatic ties with Cuba and attempted to use exiles and Central Intelligence Agency officers to invade the country. In November of that year, the U.S. engaged in a campaign of terrorism and covert operations over several years in an attempt to bring down the Cuban government. The terrorist campaign killed a significant number of civilians. In October 1962 the Cuban Missile Crisis occurred between the U.S. and Soviet Union over Soviet deployments of ballistic missiles in Cuba. Throughout the Cold War, the US heavily countered Fidel Castro's attempts to "spread communism" throughout Latin America and Africa. The Nixon, Ford, Kennedy, and Johnson administrations resorted to back-channel talks to negotiate with the Cuban government during the Cold War.

In 2014, U.S. President Barack Obama and new Cuban President Raúl Castro (the younger brother of Fidel Castro) announced the beginning of a process of normalizing relations between Cuba and the U.S., which media sources have named "the Cuban Thaw". Negotiated in secret in Canada and the Vatican City, and with the assistance of Pope Francis, the agreement led to the lifting of some U.S. travel restrictions, fewer restrictions on remittances, access to the Cuban financial system for U.S. banks, and the establishment of a U.S. embassy in Havana, which closed after Cuba became closely allied with the USSR in 1961. The countries' respective "interests sections" in one another's capitals were upgraded to embassies in 2015. In 2016, President Barack Obama visited Cuba, becoming the first sitting U.S. president in 88 years to visit the island.

On June 16, 2017, President Donald Trump announced that he was suspending the policy for unconditional sanctions relief for Cuba, while also leaving the door open for a "better deal" between the U.S. and Cuba. On November 8, 2017, it was announced that the business and travel restrictions which were loosened by the Obama administration would be reinstated and they went into effect on 9 November. On June 4, 2019, the Trump administration announced new restrictions on American travel to Cuba.

Since taking office in 2021, the Biden administration has been labeled as "tougher than Donald Trump on the island's government," although it has later reversed some of the restrictions placed during the Trump administration. However, in May 2022, the United States refused to invite the island nation to attend the 9th Summit of the Americas, drawing criticism from other Latin American countries.

Historical background

Pre-1800

Relations between the Spanish colony of Cuba and polities on the North American mainland first established themselves in the early 18th century through illicit commercial contracts by the European colonies of the New World, trading to elude colonial taxes. As both legal and illegal trade increased, Cuba became a comparatively prosperous trading partner in the region, and a center of tobacco and sugar production. During this period Cuban merchants increasingly traveled to North American ports, establishing trade contracts that endured for many years.

The British capture and temporary occupation of Havana in 1762, which many Americans participated in, opened up trade with the colonies in North and South America, and the American Revolution in 1776 provided additional trade opportunities. Spain opened Cuban ports to North American commerce officially in November 1776 and the island became increasingly dependent on that trade.

19th century
After the opening of the island to world trade in 1818, trade agreements began to replace Spanish commercial connections. In 1820 Thomas Jefferson thought Cuba is "the most interesting addition which could ever be made to our system of States" and told Secretary of War John C. Calhoun that the United States "ought, at the first possible opportunity, to take Cuba." In a letter to the U.S. Minister to Spain Hugh Nelson, Secretary of State John Quincy Adams described the likelihood of U.S. "annexation of Cuba" within half a century despite obstacles: "But there are laws of political as well as of physical gravitation; and if an apple severed by the tempest from its native tree cannot choose but fall to the ground, Cuba, forcibly disjoined from its own unnatural connection with Spain, and incapable of self support, can gravitate only towards the North American Union, which by the same law of nature cannot cast her off from its bosom."

The desire to procure Cuba intensified in the 1840s, not only in the context of manifest destiny but also in the interest of Southern power. Cuba, with some half a million slaves, would provide Southerners with extra leverage in Congress. In the late 1840s, President James K. Polk dispatched his minister to Spain Romulus Mitchell Saunders with a mission to offer $100 million to buy Cuba. Saunders however did not speak Spanish, and as then Secretary of State James Buchanan noted "even [English] he sometimes murders". Saunders was a clumsy negotiator, which both entertained and angered the Spanish. Spain replied that they would "prefer seeing [Cuba] sunk in the ocean" than sold. It may have been a moot point anyway, as it is unlikely that the Whig majority House would have accepted such an obviously pro-Southern move. The 1848 election of Zachary Taylor, a Whig, ended formal attempts to purchase the island.

In August 1851, 40 Americans who took part in Narciso López's filibustering Lopez Expedition in Cuba, including the Attorney General's nephew William L. Crittenden, were executed by Spanish authorities in Havana. News of the executions caused a furor in the South, spawning riots in which the Spanish consulate in New Orleans was burned to the ground. In 1854, a secret proposal known as the Ostend Manifesto was devised by U.S. diplomats, interested in adding a slave state to the Union. The Manifesto proposed buying Cuba from Spain for $130 million. If Spain were to reject the offer, the Manifesto implied that, in the name of Manifest Destiny, war would be necessary. When the plans became public, because of one author's vocal enthusiasm for the plan, the manifesto caused a scandal, and was rejected, in part because of objections from anti-slavery campaigners.

The Cuban rebellion 1868–1878 against Spanish rule, called by historians the Ten Years' War, gained wide sympathy in the United States. Juntas based in New York raised money and smuggled men and munitions to Cuba while energetically spreading propaganda in American newspapers. The Grant administration turned a blind eye to this violation of American neutrality. In 1869, President Ulysses Grant was urged by popular opinion to support rebels in Cuba with military assistance and to give them U.S. diplomatic recognition. Secretary of State Hamilton Fish wanted stability and favored the Spanish government and did not publicly challenge the popular anti-Spanish American viewpoint. Grant and Fish gave lip service to Cuban independence, called for an end to slavery in Cuba, and quietly opposed American military intervention. Fish worked diligently against popular pressure, and was able to keep Grant from officially recognizing Cuban independence because it would have endangered negotiations with Britain over the Alabama Claims. Daniel Sickles, the American Minister to Madrid, made no headway. Grant and Fish successfully resisted popular pressures. Grant's message to Congress urged strict neutrality and no official recognition of the Cuban revolt.

By 1877, Americans purchased 83 percent of Cuba's total exports. North Americans were also increasingly taking up residence on the island, and some districts on the northern shore were said to have more the character of America than Spanish settlements. Between 1878 and 1898 American investors took advantage of deteriorating economic conditions of the Ten Years' War to take over estates they had tried unsuccessfully to buy before while others acquired properties at very low prices. Above all this presence facilitated the integration of the Cuban economy into the North American system and weakened Cuba's ties with Spain.

1890s: Independence in Cuba

As Cuban resistance to Spanish rule grew, rebels fighting for independence attempted to get support from U.S. President Ulysses S. Grant. Grant declined and the resistance was curtailed, though American interests in the region continued. U.S. Secretary of State James G. Blaine wrote in 1881 of Cuba, "that rich island, the key to the Gulf of Mexico, and the field for our most extended trade in the Western Hemisphere, is, though in the hands of Spain, a part of the American commercial system ... If ever ceasing to be Spanish, Cuba must necessarily become American and not fall under any other European domination."After some rebel successes in Cuba's second war of independence in 1897, U.S. President William McKinley offered to buy Cuba for $300 million. Rejection of the offer, and an explosion that sank the American battleship USS Maine in Havana harbor, led to the Spanish–American War. In Cuba the war became known as "the U.S. intervention in Cuba's War of Independence". On 10 December 1898 Spain and the United States signed the Treaty of Paris and, in accordance with the treaty, Spain renounced all rights to Cuba. The treaty put an end to the Spanish Empire in the Americas and marked the beginning of United States expansion and long-term political dominance in the region. Immediately after the signing of the treaty, the U.S.-owned "Island of Cuba Real Estate Company" opened for business to sell Cuban land to Americans. U.S. military rule of the island lasted until 1902 when Cuba was finally granted formal independence.

Relations from 1900–1959
The Teller Amendment to the U.S. declaration of war against Spain in 1898 disavowed any intention of exercising "sovereignty, jurisdiction or control" over Cuba, but the United States only agreed to withdraw its troops from Cuba when Cuba agreed to the eight provisions of the Platt Amendment, an amendment to the 1901 Army Appropriations Act authored by Connecticut Republican Senator Orville H. Platt, which would allow the United States to intervene in Cuban affairs if needed for the maintenance of good government and committed Cuba to lease to the U.S. land for naval bases. Cuba leased to the United States the southern portion of Guantánamo Bay, where a United States Naval Station had been established in 1898. The Platt Amendment defined the terms of Cuban-U.S. relations for the following 33 years and provided the legal basis for U.S. military interventions with varying degrees of support from Cuban governments and political parties.

Despite recognizing Cuba's transition into an independent republic, United States Governor Charles Edward Magoon assumed temporary military rule for three more years following a rebellion led in part by José Miguel Gómez. In the following 20 years the United States repeatedly intervened militarily in Cuban affairs: 1906–09, 1912 and 1917–22. In 1912 U.S. forces were sent to quell protests by Afro-Cubans against discrimination. At first President Woodrow Wilson (1913-1921) and Secretary of State William Jennings Bryan were determined to stay out of Cuban affairs. The political turmoil continued. Cuba joined in the war against Germany, and prospered from American contracts. US Marines were stationed to protect the major sugar plantations in the Sugar Intervention. However, in 1919 political chaos again threatened the Civil War and Secretary of State Robert Lansing sent General Enoch Crowder to stabilize the situation.

By 1926 U.S. companies owned 60% of the Cuban sugar industry and imported 95% of the total Cuban crop, and Washington was generally supportive of successive Cuban governments. President Calvin Coolidge led the U.S. delegation to the Sixth International Conference of American States from January 15–17, 1928, in Havana, the only international trip Coolidge made during his presidency; it would be the last time a sitting American president visited Cuba until Barack Obama did so on March 20, 2016. However, internal confrontations between the government of Gerardo Machado and political opposition led to his military overthrow by Cuban rebels in 1933. U.S. Ambassador Sumner Welles requested U.S. military intervention. President Franklin D. Roosevelt, despite his promotion of the Good Neighbor policy toward Latin America, ordered 29 warships to Cuba and Key West, alerting United States Marines, and bombers for use if necessary. Machado's replacement, Ramón Grau assumed the Presidency and immediately nullified the Platt amendment. In protest, the United States denied recognition to Grau's government, Ambassador Welles describing the new regime as "communistic" and "irresponsible".

The rise of General Fulgencio Batista in the 1930s to de facto leader and President of Cuba for two terms (1940–44 and 1952–59) led to an era of close co-operation between the governments of Cuba and the United States. The United States and Cuba signed another Treaty of Relations in 1934. Batista's second term as president was initiated by a military coup planned in Florida, and U.S. President Harry S. Truman quickly recognized Batista's return to rule providing military and economic aid. The Batista era witnessed the almost complete domination of Cuba's economy by the United States, as the number of American corporations continued to swell, though corruption was rife and Havana also became a popular sanctuary for American organized crime figures, notably hosting the infamous Havana Conference in 1946. U.S. Ambassador to Cuba Arthur Gardner later described the relationship between the U.S. and Batista during his second term as President:

In July 1953, an armed conflict broke out in Cuba between rebels led by Fidel Castro and the Batista government. During the course of the conflict, the U.S. sold 8.238 million dollars worth of weapons to the Cuban government to help quash the rebellion. However, the U.S. was urged to end arms sales to Batista by Cuban president-in-waiting Manuel Urrutia Lleó. Washington made the critical move in March 1958 to end sales of rifles to Batista's forces, thus changing the course of the Cuban Revolution irreversibly towards the rebels. The move was vehemently opposed by U.S. ambassador Earl E. T. Smith, and led U.S. State Department adviser William Wieland to lament that "I know Batista is considered by many as a son of a bitch ... but American interests come first ... at least he was our son of a bitch."

Post-revolution relations

U.S. President Dwight D. Eisenhower officially recognized the new Cuban government after the 1959 Cuban Revolution which had overthrown the Batista government, but relations between the two governments deteriorated rapidly. Within days Earl E. T. Smith, U.S. Ambassador to Cuba, was replaced by Philip Bonsal. The U.S. government became increasingly concerned by Cuba's agrarian reforms and the nationalization of industries owned by U.S. citizens. Between 15 and 26 April 1959, Fidel Castro and a delegation of representatives visited the U.S. as guests of the Press Club. This visit was perceived by many as a charm offensive on the part of Castro and his recently initiated government, and his visit included laying a wreath at the Lincoln memorial. After a meeting between Castro and Vice President Richard Nixon, where Castro outlined his reform plans for Cuba, the U.S. began to impose gradual trade restrictions on the island. On 4 September 1959, Ambassador Bonsal met with Cuban Premier Fidel Castro to express "serious concern at the treatment being given to American private interests in Cuba both agriculture and utilities."

The Escambray rebellion was a six-year rebellion (1959–1965) in the Escambray Mountains by a group of insurgents who opposed the Cuban government led by Fidel Castro. The rebelling group of insurgents was a mix of former Batista soldiers, local farmers, and former allied guerrillas who had fought alongside Castro against Batista during the Cuban Revolution. 
As state intervention and take-over of privately owned businesses continued, trade restrictions on Cuba increased. The U.S. stopped buying Cuban sugar and refused to supply its former trading partner with much needed oil, with a devastating effect on the island's economy, leading to Cuba turning to their newfound trading partner, the Soviet Union, for petroleum. In March 1960, tensions increased when the French freighter La Coubre exploded in Havana Harbor, killing over 75 people. Fidel Castro blamed the United States and compared the incident to the sinking of the Maine, though admitting he could provide no evidence for his accusation. That same month, President Eisenhower quietly authorized the Central Intelligence Agency (CIA) to organize, train, and equip Cuban refugees as a guerrilla force to overthrow Castro.

Each time the Cuban government nationalized property belonging to American citizens, the American government took countermeasures, resulting in the prohibition of all exports to Cuba on 19 October 1960. Consequently, Cuba began to consolidate trade relations with the USSR, leading the U.S. to break off all remaining official diplomatic relations. Later that year, U.S. diplomats Edwin L. Sweet and William G. Friedman were arrested and expelled from the island having been charged with "encouraging terrorist acts, granting asylum, financing subversive publications and smuggling weapons". On 3 January 1961 the U.S. withdrew diplomatic recognition of the Cuban government and closed the embassy in Havana.

Presidential candidate John F. Kennedy believed that Eisenhower's policy toward Cuba had been mistaken. He criticized what he saw as use of U.S. government influence to advance the interest and increase the profits of private U.S. companies instead of helping Cuba to achieve economic progress, saying that Americans dominated the island's economy and had given support to one of the bloodiest and most repressive dictatorships in the history of Latin America. "We let Batista put the U.S. on the side of tyranny, and we did nothing to convince the people of Cuba and Latin America that we wanted to be on the side of freedom".

In April 1961, an armed invasion by about 1,500 CIA trained Cuban exiles at the Bay of Pigs was defeated by the Cuban armed forces. President Kennedy's complete assumption of responsibility for the venture, which provoked a popular reaction against the invasion, proved to be a further propaganda boost for the Cuban government. The U.S. began the formulation of new plans aimed at destabilizing the Cuban government. The U.S. government engaged in an extensive series of terrorist attacks in Cuba. These activities were collectively known as the "Cuban Project" or Operation Mongoose. The attacks formed a CIA-coordinated program of terrorist bombings, political and military sabotage, and psychological operations, as well as assassination attempts on key political leaders. The Joint Chiefs of Staff also proposed attacks on mainland U.S. targets, hijackings and assaults on Cuban refugee boats to generate U.S. public support for military action against the Cuban government, these proposals were known collectively as Operation Northwoods.

A U.S. Senate Select Intelligence Committee report later confirmed over eight attempted plots to kill Castro between 1960 and 1965, as well as additional plans against other Cuban leaders. After weathering the failed Bay of Pigs invasion, Cuba observed as U.S. armed forces staged a mock invasion of a Caribbean island in 1962 named Operation Ortsac. The purpose of the invasion was to overthrow a leader whose name, Ortsac, was Castro spelled backwards. Tensions between the two nations reached their peak in 1962, after U.S. reconnaissance aircraft photographed the Soviet construction of intermediate-range missile sites. The discovery led to the Cuban Missile Crisis.

Trade relations also deteriorated in equal measure. In 1962, President Kennedy broadened the partial trade restrictions imposed after the revolution by Eisenhower to a ban on all trade with Cuba, except for non-subsidized sale of foods and medicines. A year later travel and financial transactions by U.S. citizens with Cuba was prohibited. The United States embargo against Cuba was to continue in varying forms. Despite tensions between the United States and Cuba during the Kennedy years, relations began to thaw somewhat after the Cuban Missile Crisis. Back channels that had already been established at the height of tensions between the two nations began to expand in 1963. Though Attorney General Robert Kennedy worried that such contact would hurt his brother's chances of re-election, President John Kennedy continued these contacts resulting in several meetings U.S. ambassador William Atwood and Cuban officials such as Carlos Lechuga. Other contacts would be established directly between President Kennedy and Fidel Castro through media figures such as Lisa Howard and French reporter Jean Daniel days before the Kennedy Assassination with Castro stating "I am willing to declare Goldwater my friend if that will guarantee Kennedy's re-election".

Castro would continue efforts to improve relations with the incoming Johnson administration sending a message to Johnson encouraging dialogue saying:

Continued tensions over various issues would hamper further efforts to normalization relations that started at the end of the Kennedy administration such as the Guantanamo dispute of 1964, or Cuba's embrace of American political dissidents such as Black Panther leaders who took refuge in Cuba during the 1960s. Perhaps the biggest clash during the Johnson administration would be the capture of Che Guevara in 1967 by Bolivia forces assisted by the CIA and U.S. Special forces.

Through the late 1960s and early 1970s a sustained period of aircraft hijackings between Cuba and the U.S. by citizens of both nations led to a need for cooperation. By 1974, U.S. elected officials had begun to visit the island. Three years later, during the Carter administration, the U.S. and Cuba simultaneously opened interests sections in each other's capitals. 

In 1977, Cuba and the United States signed a maritime boundary treaty, agreeing on the location of their border in the Straits of Florida. The treaty was never sent to the United States Senate for ratification, but the agreement has been implemented by the U.S. State Department. In 1980, after 10,000 Cubans crammed into the Peruvian embassy seeking political asylum, Castro stated that any who wished to do so could leave Cuba, in what became known as the Mariel boatlift. Approximately 125,000 people left Cuba for the United States.

Beginning in the 1970s a growing and coordinated effort by US-based Cuban dissident groups organized to confront the Castro regime through international bodies such as the United Nations. The United Nations Human Rights Council in particular would become a major front in these confrontations as issues of human rights became more widely known, especially in the 1980s as the United States itself became more directly involved during the Reagan administration, which had a tougher anti-Castro stance. In 1981 the Reagan administration announced a tightening of the embargo. The U.S. also re-established the travel ban, prohibiting U.S. citizens from spending money in Cuba. The ban was later supplemented to include Cuban government officials or their representatives visiting the U.S.

A significant turning point in the international United Nations efforts came in 1984 when the Miami-based Center for Human Rights led by Jesús Permuy successfully lobbied to have Cuba's diplomatic representative, Luis Sola Vila, removed from a key subcommittee of the UN Human Rights Council and replaced with a representative from Ireland, a Christian-Democratic ally in opposition of the Castro government. The following year Radio y Televisión Martí, backed by the Reagan administration, began to broadcast news and information from the U.S. to Cuba. In 1987 when US President Ronald Reagan appointed Armando Valladares, former Cuban political prisoner of 22 years, as the US ambassador to the United Nations Human Rights Committee.

Since 1990, the United States has presented various resolutions to the annual UN Human Rights Commission criticizing Cuba's human rights record. The proposals and subsequent diplomatic disagreements have been described as a "nearly annual ritual". Long-term consensus between Latin American nations has not emerged. By the end of the Cold War in 1992, there had been a substantial change in Geneva as the United Nations Human Rights Committee representatives had shifted from initial rejection, then indifference and towards embrace of the anti-Castro Cuban human rights movement's diplomatic efforts.

After the Cold War
The Cold War ended with the dissolution of the Soviet Union in the early 1990s, leaving Cuba without its major international sponsor. The ensuing years were marked by economic difficulty in Cuba, a time known as the Special Period. U.S. law allowed private humanitarian aid to Cuba for part of this time. However, the long-standing U.S. embargo was reinforced in October 1992 by the Cuban Democracy Act (the "Torricelli Law") and in 1996 by the Cuban Liberty and Democracy Solidarity Act (known as the Helms-Burton Act). The 1992 act prohibited foreign-based subsidiaries of U.S. companies from trading with Cuba, travel to Cuba by U.S. citizens, and family remittances to Cuba. Sanctions could also be applied to non-U.S. companies trading with Cuba. As a result, multinational companies had to choose between Cuba and the U.S., the latter being a much larger market.

On 24 February 1996, two unarmed Cessna 337s flown by the group "Brothers to the Rescue" were shot down by Cuban Air Force MiG-29, killing three Cuban-Americans and one Cuban U.S. resident. The Cuban government claimed that the planes had entered into Cuban airspace.

Some veterans of CIA's 1961 Bay of Pigs invasion, while no longer being sponsored by the CIA, are still active, though they are now in their seventies or older. Members of Alpha 66, an anti-Castro paramilitary organization, continue to practice their AK-47 skills in a camp in South Florida.

In January 1999, U.S. President Bill Clinton eased travel restrictions to Cuba in an effort to increase cultural exchanges between the two nations. The Clinton administration approved a two-game exhibition series between the Baltimore Orioles and the Cuba national baseball team, marking the end of the hiatus since 1959 that a Major League Baseball team played in Cuba.

At the United Nations Millennium Summit in September 2000, Castro and Clinton spoke briefly at a group photo session and shook hands. U.N. Secretary-General Kofi Annan commented afterwards, "For a U.S. president and a Cuban president to shake hands for the first time in over 40 years—I think it is a major symbolic achievement". While Castro said it was a gesture of "dignity and courtesy", the White House denied the encounter was of any significance. In November 2001, U.S. companies began selling food to the country for the first time since Washington imposed the trade embargo after the revolution. In 2002, former U.S. President Jimmy Carter became the first former or sitting U.S. president to visit Cuba since 1928.

Tightening embargo
Relations deteriorated again following the election of George W. Bush. During his campaign Bush appealed for the support of Cuban-Americans by emphasizing his opposition to the government of Fidel Castro and supporting tighter embargo restrictions. Cuban Americans, who until 2008 tended to vote Republican, expected effective policies and greater participation in the formation of policies regarding Cuba-U.S. relations. Approximately three months after his inauguration, the Bush administration began expanding travel restrictions. The United States Department of the Treasury issued greater efforts to deter American citizens from illegally traveling to the island. Also in 2001, five Cuban agents were convicted on 26 counts of espionage, conspiracy to commit murder, and other illegal activities in the United States. On 15 June 2009, the U.S. Supreme Court denied review of their case. Tensions heightened as the Under Secretary of State for Arms Control and International Security Affairs, John R. Bolton, accused Cuba of maintaining a biological weapons program. Many in the United States, including ex-president Carter, expressed doubts about the claim. Later, Bolton was criticized for pressuring subordinates who questioned the quality of the intelligence John Bolton had used as the basis for his assertion. Bolton identified the Castro government as part of America's "axis of evil," highlighting the fact that the Cuban leader visited several U.S. foes, including Libya, Iran and Syria.

Following his 2004 reelection, Bush declared Cuba to be one of the few "outposts of tyranny" remaining in the world. 

In January 2006, United States Interests Section in Havana began, in an attempt to break Cuba's "information blockade", displaying messages, including quotes from the Universal Declaration of Human Rights, on a scrolling "electronic billboard" in the windows of their top floor. Following a protest march organized by the Cuban government, the government erected a large number of poles, carrying black flags with single white stars, obscuring the messages.

On 10 October 2006, the United States announced the creation of a task force made up of officials from several U.S. agencies to pursue more aggressively American violators of the U.S. trade embargo against Cuba, with penalties as severe as 10 years of prison and hundreds of thousands of dollars in fines for violators of the embargo.

In November 2006, U.S. Congressional auditors accused the development agency USAID of failing properly to administer its program for promoting democracy in Cuba. They said USAID had channeled tens of millions of dollars through exile groups in Miami, which were sometimes wasteful or kept questionable accounts. The report said the organizations had sent items such as chocolate and cashmere jerseys to Cuba. Their report concluded that 30% of the exile groups who received USAID grants showed questionable expenditures.

After Fidel Castro's announcement of resignation in 2008, U.S. Deputy Secretary of State John Negroponte said that the United States would maintain its embargo.

Vision for "democratic transition"

In 2003, the United States Commission for Assistance to a Free Cuba was formed to "explore ways the U.S. can help hasten and ease a democratic transition in Cuba." The commission immediately announced a series of measures that included a tightening of the travel embargo to the island, a crackdown on illegal cash transfers, and a more robust information campaign aimed at Cuba. Castro insisted that, in spite of the formation of the commission, Cuba is itself "in transition: to socialism [and] to communism" and that it was "ridiculous for the U.S. to threaten Cuba now".

In a 2004 meeting with members of the Commission for Assistance to a Free Cuba, President Bush stated, "We're not waiting for the day of Cuban freedom; we are working for the day of freedom in Cuba." The President reaffirmed his commitment to Cuban-Americans just in time for his 2004 re-election with promises to "work" rather than wait for freedom in Cuba.

In April 2006, the Bush administration appointed Caleb McCarry "transition coordinator" for Cuba, providing a budget of $59 million, with the task of promoting the governmental shift to democracy after Castro's death. Official Cuban news service Granma alleges that these transition plans were created at the behest of Cuban exile groups in Miami, and that McCarry was responsible for engineering the overthrow of the Aristide government in Haiti.

In 2006, the Commission for Assistance to a Free Cuba released a 93-page report. The report included a plan that suggested the United States spend $80 million to ensure that Cuba's communist system did not outlive the death of Fidel Castro. The plan also featured a classified annex that Cuban officials mistakenly claimed could be a plot to assassinate Fidel Castro or a United States military invasion of Cuba.

The "Cuban Thaw"

While relations between Cuba and the United States remained tenuous, by the late 2000s they began to improve. Fidel Castro stepped down from his leadership of the Cuban state in 2006 but officially from 2008 and Barack Obama became the president of the United States in 2009.

In April 2009, Obama, who had received nearly half of the Cuban Americans vote in the 2008 presidential election, began implementing a less strict policy towards Cuba. Obama stated that he was open to dialogue with Cuba, but that he would only lift the trade embargo if Cuba underwent political change. In March 2009, Obama signed into law a congressional spending bill which eased some economic sanctions on Cuba and eased travel restrictions on Cuban-Americans (defined as persons with a relative "who is no more than three generations removed from that person") traveling to Cuba. The April executive decision further removed time limits on Cuban-American travel to the island. Another restriction loosened in April 2009 was in the realm of telecommunications, which would allow quicker and easier access to the internet for Cuba. The loosening of restrictions is likely to help nonprofits and scientists from both countries who work together on issues of mutual concern, such as destruction of shared biodiversity and diseases that affect both populations. At the 2009 5th Summit of the Americas, President Obama signaled the opening of a new beginning with Cuba.

Obama's overtures were reciprocated, to some degree, by new Cuban leader Raúl Castro. On 27 July 2012, Raúl Castro said that the Government of Cuba is willing to hold talks with the United States government to "discuss anything". On 10 December 2013, at a state memorial service for Nelson Mandela, Barack Obama and Raúl Castro shook hands, with Castro saying in English: "Mr. President, I am Castro." Though both sides played down the handshake (much like the Clinton handshake of 2000), an adviser to Obama said that Obama wanted to improve relations with Cuba, yet had concerns about human rights on the island.

Beginning in 2013, Cuban and U.S. officials held secret talks brokered in part by Pope Francis and hosted in Canada and Vatican City to start the process of restoring diplomatic relations between Cuba and the United States. On 17 December 2014, the framework of an agreement to normalize relations and eventually end the longstanding embargo was announced by Castro in Cuba and Obama in the United States. Cuba and the United States pledged to start official negotiations with the aim of reopening their respective embassies in Havana and Washington. As part of the agreement, aid worker Alan Gross and Rolando Sarraff Trujillo, a Cuban national working as a U.S. intelligence officer, were released by the Cuban government, which also promised to free an unspecified number of Cuban nationals from a list of political prisoners earlier submitted by the United States. For its part, the U.S. government released the last three remaining members of the Cuban Five. Reaction to this change in policy within the Cuban-American community was mixed, and Cuban-American senators Bob Menendez (D-NJ), Marco Rubio (R-FL), and Ted Cruz (R-TX) all condemned the Obama administration's change in policy. However, opinion polls indicated the thaw in relations was broadly popular with the American public.

High-level diplomats from Cuba and the United States met in Havana in January 2015. While the talks did not produce a significant breakthrough, both sides described them as "productive", and Cuban Foreign Ministry official Josefina Vidal said further talks would be scheduled.

Under new rules implemented by the Obama administration, restrictions on travel by Americans to Cuba are significantly relaxed as of 16 January 2015, and the limited import of items like Cuban cigars and rum to the United States is allowed, as is the export of American computer and telecommunications technology to Cuba.

On 14 April 2015, the Obama administration announced that Cuba would be removed from the United States "State Sponsors of Terrorism" list. The House and Senate had 45 days from 14 April 2015 to review and possibly block this action, but this did not occur, and on 29 May 2015, the 45 days lapsed, therefore officially removing Cuba from the United States' list of state sponsors of terrorism. On 1 July 2015, President Barack Obama announced that formal diplomatic relations between Cuba and the United States would resume, and embassies would be opened in Washington and Havana. Relations between Cuba and the United States were formally re-established on 20 July 2015, with the opening of the Cuban embassy in Washington and the U.S. embassy in Havana. Barack Obama visited Cuba for three days in March 2016. In August 2016, JetBlue Flight 387 landed in Santa Clara, becoming the first direct commercial flight to travel between the two countries since the early 1960s. On 28 November 2016, the first normally scheduled commercial flight after more than 50 years landed in Havana from Miami on an American Airlines jet.

Trump administration
With the election of Donald Trump as U.S. president, the state of relations between the United States and Cuba was unclear as of January 2017. While a candidate for the presidency, Trump criticized aspects of the Cuban Thaw, suggesting he could suspend the normalization process unless he can negotiate "a good agreement".

On 16 June 2017, President Trump announced that he was suspending what he called a "completely one-sided deal with Cuba". Trump characterized Obama's policy as having granted Cuba economic sanctions relief for nothing in return. Since then, the administration's new policy has aimed to impose new restrictions with regards to travel and funding; however, traveling via airlines and cruise lines has not been prohibited completely. Moreover, diplomatic relations remain intact and embassies in Washington D.C. and Havana stay open.

On 12 January 2021, the U.S. State Department added Cuba to its list of state sponsors of terrorism. Secretary of State Mike Pompeo stated that Cuba harbored several American fugitives, including Assata Shakur, as well as members of the Colombian National Liberation Army and supported the regime of Nicolás Maduro. This decision was interpreted as being linked to the support of President Trump by the Cuban-American community during the 2020 U.S. election.

Health issues of U.S. diplomats in Cuba

In August 2017, reports surfaced that American and Canadian diplomats stationed in Havana had experienced unusual physical symptoms affecting the brain—including hearing loss, dizziness, and nausea. American investigators have been unable to identify the cause of these symptoms. In September 2017, the U.S. ordered nonessential diplomats and families out of Cuba as a result of these mysterious health issues.

Biden administration 
Initially, the Biden administration has kept the sanctions against Cuba that were issued by the previous presidential administration, despite one of Biden's campaign promises being to lift restrictions against the country.

In June 2021, the Biden administration continued America's tradition of voting against an annual United Nations General Assembly resolution calling for an end to the U.S. economic embargo against Cuba. The resolution was adopted for the 29th time with 184 votes in favor, three abstentions, and two no votes: the U.S. and Israel.

In July 2021, protesters gathered in front of the White House and demonstrators called on President Joe Biden to take action in Cuba. The Biden administration sanctioned a key Cuban official and a government special forces unit known as the Boinas Negras for human rights abuses in the wake of historic protests on the island. On July 22, 2021, directly before hosting a meeting with Cuban American leaders, President Biden stated "I unequivocally condemn the mass detentions and sham trials that are unjustly sentencing to prison those who dared to speak out in an effort to intimidate and threaten the Cuban people into silence." President Biden has also ordered government specialists to develop ideas for the U.S. to unilaterally extend internet access on the island, and he has promised to enhance backing for Cuban dissidents.

In August 2021, Biden sanctioned three additional Cuban officials who were also reportedly involved in the suppression of anti-government protesters in Cuba.

In December 2021, 114 Democratic House members signed a letter that urged President Biden to lift restrictions and sanctions against Cuba in order to make their access to food and medicine easier.

In January 2022, Biden again sanctioned Cuba officials, this time placing travel restrictions on eight members of the Cuban government.

In May 2022, the Biden administration lifted some sanctions on Cuba, with policy changes such as expansion of flights to Cuba and resumption of a family reunification program.

On May 20, 2022, the Biden administration added Cuba to a small list of countries that the US accuses of "not cooperating fully" in the battle against terrorism.

Trade relations
Under the Trade Sanctions Reform and Enhancement Act of 2000, exports from the United States to Cuba in the industries of food and medical products are permitted with the proper licensing and permissions from the U.S. Department of Commerce and the United States Department of the Treasury.

The Obama administration eased specific travel and other restrictions on Cuba in January 2011. A delegation from the United States Congress called on Cuban leader Raúl Castro on 24 February 2012 to discuss bilateral relations. The Congress delegation included Patrick Leahy, Democratic Senator from the state of Vermont and chairman of the Senate Committee on the Judiciary, and Richard Shelby, Republican Senator from the state of Alabama and ranking member of the Committee of Banking, Housing and Urban Matters; they went to Cuba as part of a delegation of Senators and Representatives of the Congress of United States.

Travel and import restrictions imposed by the United States were further relaxed by executive action in January 2015 as part of the Cuban Thaw.

Academic relations
Academic relations between the two nations have fluctuated, but have generally been limited since 1959. Breaking diplomatic ties 1961 stopped the routine flow of intellectual exchanges. As relations improve between United States and Soviet Union in the 1970s, increased academic ties with Cuba became possible. For example, several American universities established departments of Cuban studies, while some Cuban universities set up American studies programs. Typically the main emphasis was on literary and cultural history. The Carter administration relaxed travel restrictions in the late 1970s, but Reagan reimposed them after 1981. As the Cold War ended in the late 1980s, restrictions were again relaxed. In 1992, the Toricelli Law set up "Track 2," which facilitated intellectual cooperation between the two countries. Under Democratic President Bill Clinton, a 1999 executive directive granted licenses to universities for study abroad programs in Cuba in 1999. In 2001, however, Republican President George W. Bush reversed that decision, restricting travel through new legislation and the renewal of older laws. Under Democrat Barack Obama restrictions were cut back, but were reimposed under Pres. Donald Trump.

Guantánamo Bay

The U.S. continues to operate a naval base at Guantánamo Bay under a 1903 lease agreement "for the time required for the purposes of coaling and naval stations". The U.S. issues a check to Cuba annually for its lease, but since the revolution, Cuba has cashed only one payment. The Cuban government opposes the treaty, arguing that it violates article 52 of the 1969 Vienna Convention on the Law of Treaties, titled "Coercion of a State by the threat or use of force".

The leasing of land like the Guantánamo Bay tract was one of the requirements of the Platt Amendment, conditions for the withdrawal of United States troops remaining in Cuba following the Spanish–American War.

See also
Agreement for Democracy
Cuban Americans
Americans in Cuba
Spain–United States relations
United States–Vietnam relations
Canada–Cuba relations
Peaceful coexistence
Cuban Thaw

References

Further reading
Air Force Fellows Program Maxwell AFB. The United States and Cuba – Past, Present and Future (2014) Excerpt
Bergad, Laird W. Histories of Slavery in Brazil, Cuba, and the United States (Cambridge U. Press, 2007). 314 pp.
 Bernell, David. Constructing US foreign policy: The curious case of Cuba (2012).
 Freedman, Lawrence. Kennedy's Wars: Berlin, Cuba, Laos, and Vietnam (Oxford UP, 2000) 
 Grenville, John A. S. and George Berkeley Young. Politics, Strategy, and American Diplomacy: Studies in Foreign Policy, 1873-1917 (1966) pp 179–200 on "The dangers of Cuban independence: 1895-1897"
 Hernández, Jose M. Cuba and the United States: Intervention and Militarism, 1868–1933 (2013)
 Horne, Gerald. Race to Revolution: The United States and Cuba during Slavery and Jim Crow. New York: Monthly Review Press, 2014.
 Jones, Howard. The Bay of Pigs (Oxford University Press, 2008) 
 Laguardia Martinez, Jacqueline et al. Changing Cuba-U.S. Relations: Implications for CARICOM States (2019) online
 LeoGrande, William M. "Enemies evermore: US policy towards Cuba after Helms-Burton." Journal of Latin American Studies 29.1 (1997): 211–221. Online
LeoGrande, William M. and Peter Kornbluh. Back Channel to Cuba: The Hidden History of Negotiations between Washington and Havana. (UNC Press, 2014). 
 López Segrera, Francisco. The United States and Cuba: From Closest Enemies to Distant Friends (2017) for secondary school audiences. Excerpt
 Mackinnon, William P. "Hammering Utah, Squeezing Mexico, and Coveting Cuba: James Buchanan's White House Intriques" Utah Historical Quarterly, 80#2 (2012), pp. 132–15 https://doi.org/10.2307/45063308 in 1850s
 Offner, John L. An Unwanted War: The Diplomacy of the United States and Spain over Cuba, 1895–1898 (U of North Carolina Press, 1992) online free to borrow
Pérez, Louis A., Jr. Cuba and the United States: Ties of Singular Intimacy (2003) online free to borrow
 Sáenz, Eduardo, and Rovner Russ Davidson, eds. The Cuban Connection: Drug Trafficking, Smuggling, and Gambling in Cuba from the 1920s to the Revolution (U of North Carolina Press, 2008) 
 Smith, Wayne. The Closest of Enemies: A Personal and Diplomatic History of the Castro Years (1988), by American diplomat in Havana
 Welch, Richard E. Response to Revolution: The United States and the Cuban Revolution, 1959–1961 (U of North Carolina Press, 1985) 
 White, Nigel D. "Ending the US embargo of Cuba: international law in dispute." Journal of Latin American Studies 51.1 (2019): 163–186. Online

Historiography
 Horowitz, Irving Louis. "One Hundred Years of Ambiguity: US-Cuba Relations in the 20th Century." in Irving Louis Horowitz and Jaime Suchlicki, eds. Cuban Communism, 1959-2003 (11th ed. 2018). 25–33.
Pérez, Louis A., Jr. Cuba in the American Imagination: Metaphor and the Imperial Ethos (U. of North Carolina Press, 2008). 352 pp

Primary sources
Hoff, Rhoda, & Margaret Regler, eds. Uneasy Neighbors: Cuba and the United States (Franklin Watts, 1997) 185 pp. From Columbus to Castro

Videos

External links

History of Cuba – U.S. relations
Post-Soviet Relations Between Cuba and the US from the Dean Peter Krogh Foreign Affairs Digital Archives
Cold War International History Project: Primary Document Collection on US-Cuban Relations
BBC: Timeline: US-Cuba Relations
Complete text of the Teller amendment
Complete text of the Platt amendment
U.S. Commission for Assistance to a Free Cuba
US Judiciary Hearings of Communist Threats to America Through the Caribbean
Secret History of U.S.-Cuba Ties Reveals Henry Kissinger Plan to Bomb Havana for Fighting Apartheid. Democracy Now! 2 October 2014.

 
United States
Bilateral relations of the United States
Relations of colonizer and former colony